Lixel Rols (born 16 November 1994), is a Kenyan musician, songwriter and poet from Kisauni in Mombasa Kenya. He is the  founder of The TakeOver RM. Rols was a nominee for Kenya's 2013 and 2014 best upcoming act. His singles include Hangover, Kila siku, Kaa Ukijua and She Takeover. He launched the annual event, Wesongaman in Mombasa. Rols gained recognition locally after releasing the song Never let you go with Pendo, which was subsequently deleted from music distribution sources.

Early life 
Lixel Rols was born Roy Roland Kweyu on 16 November 1994, son to Maria Kweyu a single parent in Kisauni Mombasa. His mother was a civil servant at the Mombasa Law Courts. At 10 years old Rols was left an orphan with an older sister and brother. He roamed the streets of Nairobi and was called 'chokora', meaning "street kid" in English. Later a well wisher fostered him and sent him back to school.

At Musingu High School he studied acting, songwriting, poetry and singing. In 2007 to 2010, while in Musingu, he won national awards in Kenyan music and drama festivals. After high school his first recording deal was with African Aftermath Media for his first single Do the dance.

Career 
After the recording deal with African Aftermath Media he recorded the singles am mad, dedicated to express his pain and anger to the people for letting street kids suffer, Do the dance, which featured Alyshia, and Drop it down, featuring Wonderboy Mudda. He subsequently became an independent artist, recording Never let you go featuring Pendo, a Kenyan female singer and actress in the Nairobi Diaries TV program; after misunderstandings, and copyright and production problems, the song was deleted. Rols subsequently started his own recording label, The Takeover RM, for which he recorded the song jana usiku or, simply, Hangover. He launched The Wesongaman Party, an annual event in Mombasa. In 2018 he released the singles She Takeover and Kuta Haribika from his album The Legalized Stream.

Rols supports the empowerment of  orphans and street children. He visits orphanages around Kenya to give moral support and teach lessons in poetry and songwriting.

Discography

References 

21st-century Kenyan male singers
Living people
1994 births